This is a list of diplomatic missions in the United Kingdom.  At present, the capital city of London hosts 166 embassies and high commissions. Several other countries have ambassadors accredited to the United Kingdom, with most being resident in Brussels or Paris. There are also a number of Honorary Consuls resident in various locations in the UK.

Embassies and High Commissions in London

The following 166 countries maintain embassies in London as their primary diplomatic missions to the United Kingdom.

Representative Offices/Other Missions in London

British Overseas Territories

Other dependencies/territories
 (Spain) - Delegation
 (Belgium) - Delegation
 (Economic and Trade Office)
 (Canada) -

Disputed regions and states
 North Cyprus

 (Taipei Representative Office in the U.K.)
 National Coalition for Syrian Revolution and Opposition Forces

International organisations

:
International Organization for Migration
International Maritime Organization
United Nations High Commissioner for Refugees
World Food Programme
World Bank

Consular missions 
Some countries also maintain consular missions in the following towns and cities (Bangladesh uses the title "Assistant High Commission" instead of "Consulate-General"):

Belfast

 (Consulate General)
 (Consulate General)
 (Consulate General)

Birmingham

 (Assistant High Commission)   
 (Consulate General)
 (Consulate)

Bradford
 (Consulate)

Cardiff

 (Consulate General)

Comber
 (Consulate General)

Edinburgh

 (Consulate-General)
 (Consulate General)
 (Consulate General)
 (Consulate General)
 (Consulate-General)
 (Consulate General)
 (Consulate General)
 (Consulate General)
 (Consulate General)
 (Consulate General)
 (Consulate General)
 (Consulate General)
 (Consulate General)
 (Representative Office)
 (Consulate General)
 (Consulate)
 (Consulate General)

George Town
 (Consular Agency)

Glasgow
 (Consulate)

Hamilton
 (Consulate General)

Manchester

 (Assistant High Commission)
 (Consulate General)
 (Consulate General)
 (Consulate General)
 (Consulate General)
 (Consulate General)
 (Consulate)
 (Consulate General)
 (Consulate General)
 (Consulate General)
 (Consulate General)
 (Consulate General)
 (Consulate General)

Accredited non-resident embassies 

Resident in Brussels, Belgium:

Resident in Paris, France:

Other resident locations
 (Andorra la Vella)
 (Tarawa)
 (San Marino)

States with no or other representation in the United Kingdom
States with an Honorary Consul:
 
 
 
 
 
 
 
 
 
 
 
 
  (Tuvalu House)

For a variety of reasons the following sovereign states have no form of representation in the United Kingdom:
 
 
 

There are also a number of partially recognised states not recognised by the United Kingdom; see List of states with limited recognition''.

Closed missions

See also 
 Foreign relations of the United Kingdom
 List of diplomatic missions in Scotland
 List of diplomatic missions in Wales
 List of diplomatic missions in Northern Ireland
 List of diplomatic missions of the United Kingdom
 List of Ambassadors and High Commissioners to the United Kingdom
 List of country codes on British diplomatic vehicle registration plates
 Visa requirements for British citizens

Notes

External links 
 List of foreign embassies in the UK

References 

 
Diplomatic
United Kingdom